Lassie is an American old-time radio juvenile adventure program. It was broadcast on ABC from June 8, 1947 until May 30, 1948, and on NBC from June 5, 1948, until May 27, 1950.

Format
Although the program was titled Lassie, the dog's name varied from episode to episode because she wandered from place to place helping both people and animals, and the people the canine encountered used various names. Episodes of the show captured the essence of Eric Knight's book, Lassie Come-Home.

The sponsor was Red Heart Dog Food.

Personnel
Lassie was portrayed by Pal, the male dog that played Lassie in early films about the canine character. Trainer Rudd Weatherwax cued him to whine, bark, and pant at appropriate times. Additional sounds for Lassie and other dogs were provided by Earl Keen, an animal imitator.

Weatherwax narrated the program, and Charlie Lyon was the announcer. John Duffy was the organist. Frank Ferrin, Harry Stewart, and Hobart Donovan were producer, director, and writer, respectively.

References

External links

Logs
Partial log of episodes of Lassie from Jerry Haendiges Vintage Radio Logs
Partial log of episodes of Lassie from Old Time Radio Researchers Group
Partial log of episodes of Lassie from radioGOLDINdex

Streaming
Episodes of Lassie from Dumb.com

1947 radio programme debuts
1950 radio programme endings
1940s American radio programs
1950s American radio programs
ABC radio programs
NBC radio programs
Radio programs adapted into television shows
American children's radio programs